O'Shaughnessy Dam can refer to:
 O'Shaughnessy Dam (California), the dam that creates the Hetch Hetchy reservoir in Yosemite National Park
 O'Shaughnessy Dam (Ohio), near Columbus